Miguel Ángel Guerrero Paz (born 7 September 1967) is a Colombian football forward who played for Colombia in the 1990 FIFA World Cup. He also played for América de Cali.

References

External links
FIFA profile

1967 births
Living people
Association football forwards
Colombian footballers
Colombia under-20 international footballers
Colombia international footballers
1990 FIFA World Cup players
Categoría Primera A players
Serie A players
Serie B players
La Liga players
Atlético Bucaramanga footballers
América de Cali footballers
CD Málaga footballers
Atlético Junior footballers
S.S.C. Bari players
CP Mérida footballers
Colombian expatriate footballers
Colombian expatriate sportspeople in Spain
Expatriate footballers in Spain
Expatriate footballers in Italy
Footballers from Cali